Asa Taccone (born September 20, 1983) is an American musician, songwriter, producer, and frontman of the band Electric Guest with whom he has released three albums since 2012. He is noted as a close collaborator of The Lonely Island and has contributed to their musical work on Saturday Night Live and a number of their films. He also has written music for other comedy film and television projects including American Dad! and Portlandia.

Early life
Asa Taccone was born on September 21, 1983, the second son of Suellen Ehnebuske and Tony Taccone (a theater director) in Berkeley, California. His brother is Jorma Taccone, a former writer for Saturday Night Live and one third of the comedy music trio The Lonely Island. He is of mixed Italian and Puerto Rican ancestry on his father's side. 

His interest in music began playing trumpet in his elementary school choir during religious holidays; the choir director included a bongo section where he and other children could sing and play the drums. During high school, he became interested in jazz, continuing to play trumpet in the band. Taccone was eventually kicked out of his high school, and sent to a boot camp that he could only leave on the weekends. 

While there, he began to frequent a local Dunkin Donuts. There, he met an elderly woman who remarked that he was "an electric guest of the universe."

Career
Taccone had long been a fan of hip/hop music, and was influenced by Bay Area rappers like Souls Of Mischief, E-40, and Mac Dre. He moved on to synths and started producing hip/hop music, however, he eventually grew weary of the "bullshit" of the hip-hop world. 

One day — while visiting an incarcerated friend — another inmate recognized Taccone, requesting that they work together after his release. The incident rattled Taccone, and he left the genre for good. His already budding interest in 1960s music increased, and he began making music that stemmed from that era.

Taccone's older brother, Jorma, joined the writing staff of Saturday Night Live in 2005, and enlisted Asa in composing music for the show's Digital Shorts performed by his comedy group The Lonely Island.

Jorma asked his friend Brian Burton (professionally known as Danger Mouse) to listen to some of Asa's music over the phone. Burton provided positive feedback, encouraging the younger Taccone to continue making music. At the age of 24, Asa made the move from his hometown to Los Angeles to pursue a music career. Burton recommended that Asa take his former room in a boarding house full of musicians.

Initially, Taccone found it difficult to collaborate with others creatively, after years of writing alone. He kept "grinding", producing and writing music for projects that included Digital Shorts on comedy show Saturday Night Live, as well as scores for his father's theatrical productions, making enough money to support himself and his own music. He wrote music for Lady Gaga’s episode on The Simpsons, Kanye West’s episode on The Cleveland Show, as well as Charles Bradley and The Weeknd's episodes on American Dad. Taccone was a co-writer and co-producer on the Portugal The Man hit Feel It Still. The song became number one, and garnered the band a 2018 Grammy Award for Best Pop Duo/Group Performance.

In April 2018, Universal Music Publishing Group signed Taccone to a global administration deal.

Taccone is credited as a writer and the sole producer of the new Portugal, the Man single, Dummy.

Reception

The Guardian calls Taccone "a strutting junior Jagger with an androgynous falsetto prepared to front EG's tunes with as much gall as it takes."

Discography

With Electric Guest

 Mondo (2012)
 Plural (2017)
 Kin (2019)

Production

Songwriting for media

Collaborations with the Lonely Island 
 Saturday Night Live (2005–2008) – composer/additional music; 17 episodes
Hot Rod (2007) – songwriter
 Incredibad (2009) – The Lonely Island
 MacGruber (2010) – additional instrumentations; film
 "Motherlover" (2011) – from The Lonely Island album Turtleneck & Chain
 The Wack Album (2013) – The Lonely Island
 7 Days in Hell (2015) – music consultant; TV film
 Popstar: Never Stop Never Stopping (Original Soundtrack) (2016) — The Lonely Island

Composition for theater and film
Bridge and Tunnel (2006) – music
Taking Over (2009) – music
Lemony Snicket’s The Composer Is Dead (2010) – film underscoring
American Dad (2011–2020) – composer/voice actor; 7 episodes
Neal Brennan: 3 Mics (2017) – composer

Awards
2009 Primetime Emmy Award for Outstanding Original Music and Lyrics – "Dick in a Box"

References

1983 births
American indie rock musicians
American people of Dutch descent
American people of German descent
American people of Finnish descent
American people of Italian descent
American people of Puerto Rican descent 
Living people
Musicians from Berkeley, California